
Dean "Tex" Martin Rides Again is a 1963 studio album by Dean Martin, arranged and conducted by Marty Paich.

This album was a sequel to Martin's previous country music themed album, Dean "Tex" Martin: Country Style.

Reception

The Billboard review from 15 June 1963 selected the album for its pop spotlight, and commentated that "...both the devotees of country music and Dino will be pleased". William Ruhlmann on Allmusic.com said that "The songs may have been Nashville products technically, but [Marty] Paich got no closer to real country music than the countrypolitan style...This was country music by way of Hollywood. But that suited Martin, who sounded as at ease as ever. If there was any criticism to be made of his approach, it was that he brought little sense of emotional turmoil to some of the romantic laments here".

Track listing

Personnel 
 Dean Martin – vocals
 Marty Paich - arranger, conductor
 Merle Travis - liner notes

References 

1963 albums
Dean Martin albums
Albums arranged by Marty Paich
Albums conducted by Marty Paich
Albums produced by Jimmy Bowen
Reprise Records albums